Mount Kjerka is a mountain,  high, at the south end of the Gustav Bull Mountains,  south of Mount Marsden, in Mac. Robertson Land, Antarctica. It was mapped by Norwegian cartographers from aerial photographs taken by the Lars Christensen Expedition (1936–37) and named Kjerka (the church).

References

Mountains of Mac. Robertson Land